Anbu Kattalai is a 1989 Indian Tamil-language film directed by Yaar Kannan, starring Ramarajan, Pallavi and K. R. Vijaya. It was released on 28 October 1989.

Cast
Ramarajan
Pallavi
K. R. Vijaya
 Goundamani
 Senthil
Vinu Chakravarthy
Kitty
Kullamani
King Kong
Kanal Kannan as Henchman (special appearance)

Soundtrack
The music was composed by Ilaiyaraaja.

Release
Anbu Kattalai was released on 28 October 1989 on the occasion of Diwali alongside another Ramarajan starrer Thangamana Raasa.

References

External links
 

1989 films
Films scored by Ilaiyaraaja
1980s Tamil-language films